Mong Kok East is one of the 20 constituencies in the Yau Tsim Mong District.

The constituency returns one district councillor to the Yau Tsim Mong District Council, with an election every four years. The seat is currently vacant,the former district councillor is Ben Lam Siu-pan from (Community March).

Mong Kok East constituency is loosely based on eastern part of Mongkok with estimated population of 15,444.

Councillors represented

Election results

2010s

2000s

1990s

1980s

References

Mong Kok
Constituencies of Hong Kong
Constituencies of Yau Tsim Mong District Council
1982 establishments in Hong Kong
Constituencies established in 1982